James Joseph, Jr.  (born October 28, 1967) is a former professional American football running back in the National Football League.

He attended Auburn University, and was drafted by the Philadelphia Eagles in the seventh round of the 1991 NFL Draft.  In his rookie year Joseph was the Eagles' leading rusher with 440 yards. After four seasons with the Eagles, in 1995, Joseph joined the Cincinnati Bengals, where he played one season.

References

1967 births
Living people
Players of American football from Alabama
People from Phenix City, Alabama
American football running backs
Auburn Tigers football players
Philadelphia Eagles players
Cincinnati Bengals players
Auburn High School (Alabama) people

He later taught Physical Education in August 2021 at LEAD Academy-Montgomery AL.

He is still teaching today as of August 2022